The superficial branch of the ulnar nerve is a terminal branch of the ulnar nerve. It supplies the palmaris brevis and the skin on the ulnar side of the hand. It also divides into a common palmar digital nerve and a proper palmar digital nerve.

The proper digital branches are distributed to the fingers in the same manner as those of the median nerve.

References

External links
 

Nerves of the upper limb